Rossana Rossanda (23 April 1924 – 20 September 2020) was an Italian communist politician, journalist, and feminist.

Biography
Rossanda was born in Pula, then part of Italy. She studied in Milan and was a student of philosopher Antonio Banfi. At a very young age, she took part in the Italian resistance and, following the end of World War II, she joined the Italian Communist Party (PCI). After a short period, secretary Palmiro Togliatti named her responsible for culture in the party. She was elected for the first time to the Italian Chamber of Deputies in 1963.

In 1968 she published a small essay, entitled L'anno degli studenti ("The Year of the students"), in which she declared her support for the youth movement. Rossanda was part of a minority inside the PCI that was against the Soviet Union, and, together with Luigi Pintor, Valentino Parlato, and Lucio Magri founded the party and newspaper il manifesto. This caused her expulsion from the Communist Party after its XII National Congress held in Bologna.

In the 1972 elections, Il Manifesto obtained only 0.8%  of the votes. It therefore merged with the Proletarian Unity Party, forming the Proletarian Unity Party for Communism. She later abandoned party politics but kept her role as director of il manifesto.

Rossanda died on 20 September 2020 at the age of 96.

Selected works
L'anno degli studenti (1968)
Über die Dialektik von Kontinuität und Bruch (1975)
Le altre. Conversazioni sulle parole della politica (1979)
“A Splendid Life”. Telos 44 (Summer 1980)
Un viaggio inutile (1981)
Appuntamenti di fine secolo (1995)
La vita breve (Pratiche, 1996)
Note a margine (1996)
La ragazza del secolo scorso (2005,  finalist for the Premio Strega 2006).

References

External links
Class and Party
Mao's Marxism
Revolutionary Intellectuals and the Soviet Union
Sartre's Political Practice

1924 births
2020 deaths
20th-century Italian politicians
Italian Communist Party politicians
Italian journalists
Italian newspaper founders
Italian women writers
Italian writers
Members of the Chamber of Deputies (Italy)
People from Pula
Italian socialist feminists
Italian women company founders
Italian resistance movement members
Il manifesto editors
Italian newspaper editors